Annalynn is a 2D platform game created by Cruise Elroy released on January 29, 2021 for Microsoft Windows. It is styled after similar arcade games from the 1980s. The game stars the titular character Annalynn, as they explore five zones and eighteen levels to collect gems and kick snakes.

Plot 
Annalynn discovers a new cave rich with resources, and follows it deeper into the territory of the Venom Brood. These four snakes, Randy, Handy, Candy, and Mike, are protective of their cave and their riches, and will do anything in their power to stop her. Annalynn descends deep into the cave, through jungle, lava, and ice, before descending into the home of the Venom Brood. There, Annalynn must defeat the final boss, a large mechanical snake named the "SN-4K3" piloted by the Venom Brood. Upon destroying the SN-4K3, Annalynn boards a lift to return to the surface.

Gameplay 

Annalynn iterates on gameplay from 1980s arcade games, such as  Pac-Man, Donkey Kong Jr., and Mappy. In each level, the  goal is to collect all coins and rubies while avoiding contact with the four enemy snakes. Bonus items are only available to collect for a short period of time. After dying three times the player will receive a game over, and have the option of continuing after inserting another credit- but with the penalty of having their points halved.

There are four enemy snakes in each stage, named Randy, Handy, Candy, and Mike. Each snake will spawn through doors throughout the level, and will seek Annalynn in a different pattern. Although snakes Randy, Handy, and Candy all follow a set seeking pattern, the snake Mike does not have an easily predictable seeking pattern. By understanding the patterns of the snakes to predict their movements, the player can learn to avoid them easily. The snakes can seek Annalynn by moving through doors placed throughout the stage, jumping off ledges, or falling through pits. When Annalynn makes contact with a snake, the player will lose a life, and begin the stage again. However, if Annalynn collects a ruby, she will enter a state of invincibility where she can kick any of the snakes off the stage temporarily. During this period, each snake will cease their normal seeking pattern and instead slowly move away from Annalynn. After a short period, the snakes will reenter the stage.

Players compete to achieve a high score by obtaining points from collecting rubies, coins, and bonus items, and by kicking snakes in succession. In a key deviance from that era's arcades, Annalynn does have a final boss and technical end to the game in its story mode. However, in random mode, players have the option of playing the game on an infinite loop.

There are six zones, each with a distinct gimmick.

Development 

Development of Annalynn began on January 28, 2016 for fangame site Mario Fan Games Galaxy's Super Competition of 2016. The contest challenged submissions to use original assets for their games, leading developer Cruise Elroy to create an original premise for their entry. Annalynn began development on the engine GameMaker: Studio entitled Minecade, and would feature a generic male miner as the player character and four enemy moles. However, citing Ms. Pac-Man as inspiration, Elroy created the female player character and four simpler enemy snakes that would appear in the final game. After two weeks of development, this release of Annalynn was published on the site on February 12, 2016, becoming the winning title of the competition. Later, Annalynn won the site's Game of the Month award in March 2016.

Following this 2016 release, Elroy announced that he would begin work on a remake of Annalynn, promising improved graphics, music, and levels. Subsequently, the game saw multiple changes over the next four years. Development moved to the engine GameMaker: Studio 2, sprites and physics were redone, four additional zones and collectables were added, and the music was recomposed to mimic the sound of Namco's Waveform Sound Generator. Elroy received assistance with some of these new assets, with composers Isaac Riley and RRThiel providing music, and artist SparkBag contributing promotional art. Elroy stated that part of their vision for Annalynn was to create an arcade title similar in style to those of the 1980's, but accommodating to a modern audience. He sought to find a compromise between the difficult nature of arcade titles, while keeping the drive to insert another coin and continue after a game over. On August 17, 2020, Annalynn received a public demo available for download during the Sonic Amateur Games Expo in 2020, giving the public their first view of the remake. The demo contained the first six levels available in the final game, and was met with success seeing over three thousand downloads and a five star rating. On January 29, 2021, Annalynn was released on Steam and Itch.io for Microsoft Windows, celebrating the game's five year anniversary.

Annalynn was verified for the Steam Deck on August 5, 2022.

Reception 

On November 11, 2022, the game received a line of merchandise from merchandising company The Yetee.

References 

2021 video games
Platform games
Windows games
Windows-only games